Jack Tuttle (born 2 February 1995) is an Australian rugby union fullback who currently plays for the Queensland Reds in the international Super Rugby competition.

Early / provincial career

Born and raised in Brisbane, Tuttle attended the famous St Joseph's College, Nudgee where he appeared in their first XV alongside younger brother James.   During his time there, he represented Queensland at Under-16 and schoolboy level.   Upon leaving high school, he switched codes to rugby league and spent 2 years with the Brisbane Broncos under-20 side.   He returned to rugby union at the end of 2015 and started playing for Norths in the Queensland Premier Rugby competition.

Super Rugby career

He played 2 games in total, collecting 1 yellow card in the process.

Super Rugby statistics

References

1995 births
Living people
Australian rugby union players
Rugby union fullbacks
Queensland Reds players
Rugby union players from Brisbane